The 1920–21 Penn Quakers men's ice hockey season was the 9th season of play for the program.

Season
With most programs having now returned from absences caused by World War I, Penn was hoping to form a new intercollegiate league with old rivals from the IHA. Harvard, the leading program at the time, elected to only keep its arrangement with Princeton and Yale. As a result, plans for the league were changed to allow Harvard to participate; instead of a conference, the league would operate in a more informal manner that would facilitate scheduling between teams as well as to certify rules that all members could accept. With those modifications, Penn was able to join the Intercollegiate Ice Hockey Association of America with five of its contemporaries, but membership was not the stabilizing force that Penn hoped it would be.

Penn had originally hoped to schedule a practice game before the winter break but no arrangement could be finalized. After Christmas the team was supposed to open the season on the 7th and 8th of January, but both games were cancelled due to scheduling conflicts. In the end they were able to rope the St. Nicholas Hockey Club into a game on the 8th before playing their first intercollegiate game the following week.

In February Harvard finally accepted the inevitable and agreed to play 6-on-6 hockey beginning the following year. As a result the expectation was that the Intercollegiate league that had just been formed would become a fully-formed conference in the near future. The news came amidst a good streak for the Quakers with the team going 3–0–1 and looking like they would have a chance to earn a split with Princeton, but the Tigers, who were using the Philadelphia Ice Palace as their home rink, shut down the Penn offense and won the game 2–0.

Roster

Standings

Schedule and Results

|-
!colspan=12 style=";" | Regular Season

References

Penn Quakers men's ice hockey seasons
Penn
Penn
Penn
Penn